Pang Tu-sop ( is a North Korean army general and politician.

Biography
He was known to be appointed as commander of the Second Corps of the Korean People's Army in 2015. In May 2016, following the 7th Congress of the Workers' Party of Korea he was elected a full member of the 7th Central Committee of the Workers' Party of Korea.

References

North Korean generals
Members of the 8th Central Committee of the Workers' Party of Korea

ko:방두섭